Cercle Mbéri Sportif is a Gabonese football club based in Libreville, Gabon.

The club currently plays in Gabon Championnat National D1

Stadium
Currently the team plays at the 7,000 capacity Stade Augustin Monédan de Sibang.

Performance in CAF competitions
CAF Champions League: 1 appearance
2020 – Preliminary Round

CAF Confederation Cup: 0 appearance

External links

Soccerway

Football clubs in Gabon